Vaklino is a village in Shabla Municipality, Dobrich Province, northeastern Bulgaria.
The village is located few minutes from the border with Romania. While the village of Vaklino is very quiet and uneventful, it is just across the border from Vama Veche, a Romanian town very popular (for its size) among backpackers. From visitor's point of view, Vaklino has only an abandoned remnant of central square and no stores or services of any kind. Apart from its people and their certainly unique life-stories, it offers only the picturesqueness of an utterly insignificant Eastern European village. Most people in this Village are either its residents or passers by on the road from Romania to more southern parts of Bulgaria.

References

Villages in Dobrich Province